Eulima leptozona is a species of sea snail, a marine gastropod mollusk in the family Eulimidae. The species is one of a number within the genus Eulima.

Description

The shell measures approximately 3 mm and can be found at depths of about 815 m below sea level.

Distribution

This species occurs in the following locations:

 European waters (ERMS scope)

References

External links
 To World Register of Marine Species

leptozona
Gastropods described in 1896